The M14 is a short metropolitan route in Johannesburg, South Africa. The route connects Jeppestown and the eastern Johannesburg CBD with Primrose and northern Germiston.

Route 
The M14 begins as a T-junction with the R29 Main Reef Road in Jeppestown. The route heads east as Jules Street and into Malvern. At the end of Malvern, the route crosses the M33 Monmouth and 31st Streets. Continuing east for a short distance, it splits and continues north-east now as Geldenhuis Road and meets the M52 Van Buuren Road. Continuing north-east, now as Cydonia Road, crossing the N3 Eastern Bypass through Primrose Hill. Here it becomes Gorst Avenue then Churchill Avenue in Primrose ending when it intersects the M37 A.G. de Witt Drive and Shamrock Road.

References 

Streets and roads of Johannesburg
Metropolitan routes in Johannesburg